Gao Li is a Chinese sprint canoer who competed in the early 2000s. She won a silver medal in the K-4 1000 m event at the 2002 ICF Canoe Sprint World Championships in Seville, Spain.

References

Chinese female canoeists
Living people
Year of birth missing (living people)
ICF Canoe Sprint World Championships medalists in kayak